Ray of Sunshine is a 1919 Dutch silent film directed by Theo Frenkel.

Cast
 Kees Lageman - Jan van Zutphen
 Frits Bouwmeester - Maurits Groen
 Annie Wesling - Maurits Groen's vrouw

External links 
 

1919 films
Dutch silent feature films
Dutch black-and-white films
Films directed by Theo Frenkel